The Mid-North Monitor is a Canadian weekly newspaper, published in Espanola, Ontario. The newspaper has a readership circulation of just under 2,400 copies weekly.

History

The newspaper just celebrated its 30th anniversary in 2008 as the Mid-North Monitor, but there were several predecessors including the Mid-North Weekly and the Espanola Standard. The region is also served by the Sudbury Star.

In addition to Espanola, the newspaper serves the communities Sables-Spanish Rivers, Baldwin, Nairn and Hyman and Spanish, as well as the first nations of Serpent River, Sagamok and Whitefish River.

See also
List of newspapers in Canada

External links
 Mid-North Monitor
 

Postmedia Network publications
Weekly newspapers published in Ontario
Espanola, Ontario
Publications established in 1978
1978 establishments in Ontario